Singleton Park is the largest urban park in the city of Swansea. It is located in Sketty and is listed on the Cadw/ICOMOS Register of Parks and Gardens of Special Historic Interest in Wales.

The park comprises 250 acres of land. An ornamental garden is located to the south, near the entrance to Swansea University, and a walled botanical garden is located in the centre of the park. On the south-western corner, past the hospital and the university, there is a boating lake with pedalos available, as well as a miniature golf course.

History

The park was originally part of the Vivian family estate, which was purchased by Swansea County Borough Council in 1919 for use as a public park.  The park superintendent Daniel Bliss, who was trained at Kew Gardens was responsible for the conception of the Singleton Farm botanical gardens and Ornamental Gardens.  He was also the main driver behind the purchase of the Vivian estate.

There is an Swiss cottage located inside the park. This was designed by architect P.F. Robinson, who designed Sketty Hall as well as a number of other lodges in the park. The cottage was badly damaged in 2010 in an arson attack but has now been restored and there are plans to use the space as a cafe.  The lakeside pub, Inn on the Lake, became so well known as The Pub On the Pond that the owner later gave in and changed the name. 

The park has hosted many entertainment and cultural events such as  Party in the Park and Proms in the Park which were regular events by local stations The Wave & Swansea Sound and other music events held by the two stations and their partners are Escape into the Park and the former Stars in the Park.  The BBC has hosted Proms on the Park and the Biggest Weekend.  Artists who have held concerts in the park include Jess Glynne and the Stereophonics.

The Friends of the City of Swansea Botanical Complex have commissioned the creation of a bi-lingual commemorative panel to celebrate the Centenary of Singleton Park being in public ownership. The panel will be displayed in the Botanical Gardens.  This panel was unveiled by descendants of the Vivian family on Sunday 4 August 2019. In 2022 the park, including the former gardens of Sketty Hall, was listed at Grade I on the Cadw/ICOMOS Register of Parks and Gardens of Special Historic Interest in Wales.

Amenities
Located in the grounds of Singleton Park are:
 Bishop Gore School
 Swansea University main campus
 Singleton Abbey
 The Taliesin Arts Centre (which houses a theatre and Ancient Egyptian museum)
 Singleton Hospital
 Sketty Hall
 St. Paul's church with Vivian family  graves 
 Headquarters of 44th Swansea Scout Group
The Botanical Gardens and FCSBC Plant Sales Shop [Supporting the Botanical Gardens

See also
List of gardens in Wales
The Botanical Gardens

Reference list

External links

Swansea Gov: Singleton Park
Singleton Park map location and accommodation

 Complete listing of all Listed Buildings within The City and County of Swansea.

Parks in Swansea
Swansea University
Botanical gardens in Wales
Swansea Bay
Registered historic parks and gardens in Swansea